George Rosenberg Roberts (born 1943) is an American financier. He is one of the three original partners of Kohlberg Kravis Roberts (KKR), which he co-founded alongside Jerome Kohlberg and first cousin Henry Kravis in 1976.

Early life
George Roberts was born into a Jewish family in Houston, Texas. He graduated from Culver Military Academy in 1962 and received the institution's "Man of the Year" Award in 1998. He attended Claremont McKenna College, graduating in 1966, and the University of California's Hastings College of the Law, graduating in 1969.

Career
Roberts worked for Bear Stearns in the late 1960s and early 1970s becoming a partner at the age of 29. While at Bear Stearns, Roberts, alongside Kohlberg and Kravis, began a series of what they described as "bootstrap" investments. Their acquisition of Orkin Exterminating Company in 1964 is among the first significant leveraged buyout transactions. In the following years the three Bear Stearns bankers would complete a series of buyouts including Stern Metals (1965), Incom (a division of Rockwood International, 1971), Cobblers Industries (1971), and Boren Clay (1973) as well as Thompson Wire, Eagle Motors and Barrows through their investment in Stern Metals. Although they had a number of highly successful investments, the $27 million investment in Cobblers ended in bankruptcy.

By 1976, tensions had built up between Bear Stearns and the trio of Kohlberg, Kravis and Roberts leading to their departure and the formation of Kohlberg Kravis Roberts in that year.  Most notably, Bear Stearns executive Cy Lewis had rejected repeated proposals to form a dedicated investment fund within Bear Stearns and Lewis took exception to the amount of time spent on outside activities. Early investors in KKR included Henry Hillman By 1978, with the revision of the ERISA regulations, the nascent KKR was successful in raising the first institutional fund with investor commitments.

He has an estimated net worth of $5.9 billion .

Personal life
In 1968, he married Leanne Bovet, daughter of Eric B. Bovet and Dorothy Champion of San Mateo, California. Bovet's father was a member of the Swiss Borel family of San Mateo being the son of Swiss immigrant Louis Bovet and Grace Borel (the daughter of the family patriarch, Swiss immigrant Antoine Borel, a  banker in San Mateo, California). She died in 2003.

On May 22, 2010, he married Goldman Sachs partner Linnea Conrad.

Philanthropic and public positions
Roberts is the founder and chairman of the boards of directors of non-profit organizations such as the Roberts Enterprise Development Fund (REDF), which focuses on job creation. He also serves as a trustee of Claremont McKenna College and Culver Military Academy, and is a board member of San Francisco Symphony, San Francisco Ballet, and the Fine Arts Museum.

In 2012, he donated $50 million to Claremont McKenna College. He again donated $140 million to CMC in 2022.

Awards and honors
Golden Plate Award of the American Academy of Achievement, 1988

References

External links
 Roberts winning 'Man of the Year' award

1944 births
20th-century American businesspeople
21st-century American businesspeople
21st-century American Jews
American billionaires
American financiers
American investors
Bear Stearns people
businesspeople from California
businesspeople from Houston
Claremont McKenna College alumni
Culver Academies alumni
Jewish American philanthropists
Kohlberg Kravis Roberts
living people
people from Atherton, California
private equity and venture capital investors
University of California, Hastings College of the Law alumni